The discography of English synth-pop duo Yazoo consists of two studio albums, one live album, six compilation albums, two extended plays (EPs) and nine singles. Their debut studio album, Upstairs at Eric's, achieved platinum status both in the United Kingdom and the United States.

Yazoo had success during the early part of the decade with two hit studio albums and five hit singles. Since their split in 1983, there has been some commercial success with releases of compilation albums and remixed singles across Europe and the US.

Albums

Studio albums

Live albums

Compilation albums

Extended plays

Singles

Other charted songs

Notes

References

External links
 
 

Discographies of British artists
New wave discographies
Pop music group discographies